North Montpelier is an unincorporated village in the town of East Montpelier, Washington County, Vermont, United States.

References

Unincorporated communities in Washington County, Vermont
Unincorporated communities in Vermont